Joseph Dan-Tyrell is a Samoan footballer who plays as a midfielder for Central United and the Samoa national football team. He made his debut for the national team on August 31, 2015 in a 3–2 victory against American Samoa In July 2021, he signed for Eastern Suburbs Nuggsy who are top of the table in NRFL Div. 1 Championship.

References 

1994 births
Living people
People with acquired Samoan citizenship
Samoan footballers
Association football midfielders
Samoa international footballers
2016 OFC Nations Cup players
Association footballers from Auckland
New Zealand association footballers
New Zealand sportspeople of Samoan descent